Aqeel Baalghyth Al-Sahbi (born 15 March 1987) is a Saudi professional footballer who plays as a defender for Jeddah. He is a former Saudi Arabia international.

Honours
Al-Faisaly
 Saudi First Division: 2009-10

Al-Ahli
 Saudi Professional League: 2015–16
 King Cup of Champions: 2012, 2016
 Saudi Crown Prince Cup: 2014-15
 Saudi Super Cup: 2016

References

External links 
 

1987 births
Living people
Jeddah Club players
Al-Faisaly FC players
Al-Ahli Saudi FC players
Al-Raed FC players
Saudi Arabia international footballers
Saudi Arabian footballers
Sportspeople from Jeddah
Saudi First Division League players
Saudi Professional League players
Association football defenders